Jung Joo-ri (born 1980), also known as July Jung, is a South Korean film director and screenwriter. Jung's directorial debut feature A Girl at My Door won the Best First Film at the 25th Stockholm International Film Festival. She also won the Best New Director at the 23rd Buil Film Awards and Best Director/Screenwriter at the 15th Women in Film Korea Awards in 2014, and Best Screenplay at the 2nd Wildflower Film Awards and Best New Director for film at the 51st Baeksang Arts Awards in 2015.

Filmography 
The Wind Blows To the Hope (short film, 2006) - director, screenwriter, editor, art director
A Man Under the Influenza (short film, 2007) - director, screenwriter, producer, editor
11 (short film, 2008) - director, screenwriter
Let Us Go (short film, 2008) - assistant director
The Stopless Mind (short film, 2009) - assistant director
A Dog-Came Into My Flash (short film, 2010) - director
A Girl at My Door (2014) - director, screenwriter
Next Sohee (2022) - director, screenwriter

Awards 
2014 23rd Buil Film Awards: Best New Director (A Girl at My Door)
2014 15th Women in Film Korea Awards: Best Director/Screenwriter (A Girl at My Door)
2015 2nd Wildflower Film Awards: Best Screenplay (A Girl at My Door)
2015 51st Baeksang Arts Awards: Best New Director (Film) (A Girl at My Door)
2022 — 26th Fantasia International Film Festival Best Director (Next Sohee)

References

External links 
 
 
 
 

1980 births
Living people
South Korean film directors
South Korean women film directors
South Korean screenwriters